"Nasty" is a song by English singer Pixie Lott from her self-titled third studio album (2014). It was released on 7 March 2014 as the album's lead single by Mercury Records. The accompanying music video was filmed in November 2013 and directed by Bryan Barber. A second version featured British band The Vamps was released in the same day only in United Kingdom and Ireland.

"Nasty" was previously recorded by American singer Christina Aguilera in collaboration with CeeLo Green for inclusion on the soundtrack to the 2010 film Burlesque, which stars Aguilera and Cher, but it was ultimately scrapped from the official track listing due to legal issues concerning sample clearance.

Background
"Nasty" was previously recorded by several artists, including Christina Aguilera, who recorded the song as a duet with CeeLo Green for her debut film project Burlesque (2010). However, their version did not make the final track listing due to legal issues concerning sample clearance. After Lott's legal team managed to clear all of the song's samples, the singer recorded her own version of the song and released it as the first single from her self-titled third studio album. In an interview with Metro, Lott explained, "A few other singers had recorded it and Christina was one of them so everyone wanted this song. When I heard other singers had done it I thought 'I need to get this!' It was a difficult song to get because there are so many old-school samples on it, like James Brown, that are hard to clear copyright on. But I got it and now it is my new single."

Commercial performance
"Nasty" debuted on the UK Singles Chart at number nine, selling 30,812 copies in its first week.

Music videos
The music video was filmed in London in November 2013 and was directed by Bryan Barber. The video premiered on 15 January 2014. The video, starring Lott, sees her approach a man in a bar, and as she is attracted to him, she strips down to her bra and skirt and they dance together seductively.

A music video for the version of the song featuring The Vamps was directed by Dean Sherwood and released on 4 February 2014.

Track listings
Digital download
"Nasty" – 2:46

Digital download (featuring The Vamps)
"Nasty" (featuring The Vamps) – 2:47

iTunes EP
"Nasty" – 2:46
"When You Were My Man" (Live at The Pool/2013) – 3:53
"Wake Me Up" (Live at The Pool/2013) – 2:47
"(Your Love Keeps Lifting Me) Higher and Higher" – 3:26

Amazon MP3 and 7digital EP
"Nasty" – 2:46
"When You Were My Man" (Live at The Pool/2013) – 3:53
"Royals" (Live at The Pool/2013) – 3:37
"(Your Love Keeps Lifting Me) Higher and Higher" – 3:26

UK CD single
"Nasty" – 2:46
"The Point of No Return " – 3:13
"Cry to Me" (Live at The Pool/2013) – 3:15
"Nasty" (Mike Mago Remix) – 5:35

Credits and personnel
Credits adapted from the liner notes of the "Nasty" CD single.

 Pixie Lott – vocals
 Michael Duke – additional vocals
 Stuart Hawkes – mastering engineering
 Long Island – mixing
 Jay Reynolds – additional drum programming
 Jack Splash – arrangement, drums, engineering, production, keyboards, percussion

Charts

Release history

References

2014 singles
2014 songs
Mercury Records singles
Music videos directed by Bryan Barber
Music videos shot in London
Pixie Lott songs
Songs written by Billy Nicholls
Songs written by CeeLo Green
Songs written by Claude Kelly
Songs written by Harry Wayne Casey
Songs written by Jack Splash
Songs written by James Brown
Songs written by Richard Finch (musician)
The Vamps (British band) songs
Virgin EMI Records singles